Mobutu, King of Zaire (orig. French title: Mobutu, roi du Zaïre) is a 1999 documentary film about Mobutu Sese Seko, the long-time President of Zaire (now known as the Democratic Republic of the Congo).

Awards
 Mention of honor in "Seen by Africa" on 1999 - Montreal - Canada
 Nominee in Los Angeles by international Documentary Association (IDA) for the IDA Awards - United States
 Special mention during the delivery of European Films Awards for Berlin - Germany

External links
 Copy of the English version of the documentary on YouTube
 Copy of the original French documentary on YouTube

1999 films
1990s French-language films
Documentary films about politicians
Documentary films about African politics
Documentary films about the Democratic Republic of the Congo
Mobutu Sese Seko
1990s English-language films